Super League XXVII, known as the Betfred Super League XXVII for sponsorship reasons, was the 27th season of the Super League and 128th season of rugby league in Great Britain.

The season commenced on 10 February 2022 and ended with the Grand Final on 24 September 2022.

St Helens were the reigning champions going into Super League XXVII, after successfully retaining their title, beating Catalans Dragons in the 2021 Grand Final.

For the first time in Super League, there were two French teams in the competition, as Toulouse Olympique were promoted from the Championship, by beating Featherstone Rovers in the 2021 Million Pound Game.

Toulouse were immediately relegated back to the Championship, following a 14–24 defeat at home to Catalans Dragons on 25 August, having only won 5 games from 25 they were rooted to the bottom of the table and with only 2 games of the regular season remaining and 4 points to play for, they could not catch Wakefield in 11th place.

On 15 July 2022, Bevan French broke the record for most tries scored in a Super League game, during Wigan Warriors 60–0 win over Hull FC, scoring seven tries.
The previous record for most tries scored in a Super League game was held by Lesley Vainikolo, who scored six tries for Bradford Bulls - also against Hull - in 2005.

Following Toulouse's relegation from super league, Leigh Centurions, were immediately promoted back to super league, after they beat Batley Bulldogs 44–12 in the  2022 Million Pound Game,  losing only 1 game all season against Featherstone Rovers.

Teams

End-of-season awards

The end of season awards took place on Tuesday 20 September, having originally being scheduled for the previous day but were moved as a mark of respect for the Queen's Funeral, which took place on Monday 19 September.

Table

Fixtures and results

Golden point extra time
If a match ends in a draw after 80 minutes, then a further 10 minutes of golden point extra time is played, to determine a winner (5 minutes each way). The first team to score either a try, penalty goal or drop goal during this period, will win the match. However, if there are no further scores during the additional 10 minutes period, then the match will end in a draw.

Game 1 (Leeds Rhinos v Huddersfield Giants) 
The round 8 game between Leeds Rhinos and Huddersfield Giants on 14 April 2022, finished 20-all after 80 minutes. The game then went to extra time, which saw numerous drop goal attempts by both teams. Neither teams were able to score any points during the extra 10 minutes, which meant the match ended as a draw for the first time this season.

Game 2 (Wakefield Trinity v Hull FC) 
The round 14 game between Wakefield Trinity and Hull FC on 5 June 2022, finished 18-all after 80 minutes. The game then went to extra time, which saw numerous drop goal attempts by both teams. Wakefield eventually won the match 19–18, with a drop goal from Jacob Miller.

Game 3 (Castleford Tigers v Catalans Dragons) 
The round 16 game between Castleford Tigers and Catalans Dragons on 26 June 2022, finished 16-all after 80 minutes. The game then went to extra time, which saw numerous drop goal attempts by both teams. Castleford won the match 17–16, with a drop goal from Danny Richardson.

Game 4 (Wakefield Trinity v St Helens) 
The round 20 game between Wakefield Trinity v St Helens on 24 July 2022, finished 12-all after 80 minutes. The game then went to extra time, which saw numerous drop goal attempts by both teams. St Helens won the match 13–12, with a drop goal from Jack Welsby.

Game 5 (Catalans Dragons v Leeds Rhinos) 
The round 21 game between Catalans Dragons and Leeds Rhinos on 30 July 2022, finished 32-all after 80 minutes, despite Leeds trailing 6-30, and with only 12 men, the game then went to extra time, which saw numerous drop goal attempts by both teams. Leeds won the match 36–32, with a try from Aiden Sezer.

Game 6 (Huddersfield Giants v Wakefield Trinity) 
The round 27 game between Huddersfield Giants and Wakefield Trinity on 2 September 2022, finished 14-all after 80 minutes, which saw numerous drop goal attempts by both teams. 
This was the third time that Wakefield had been taken to extra time, whilst this was Huddersfield's second. Huddersfield eventually won the match 16–14, with a penalty goal from Will Pryce.

Play-offs

The top two teams in the regular season table (St Helens and Wigan Warriors) received byes to the semi-finals. The four teams who finish third to sixth contested the two elimination finals, with the winners of those two games moving on to the semi finals.

Team bracket

Summary

Player statistics

Top 10 try scorers

Top 10 try assists

Top 10 goal scorers

Top 10 points scorers

Updated to games played on 2 September 2022 (Round 27)

Discipline

Red Cards

Yellow Cards

 Updated to matches played on 14 August 2022 (Round 23)

Attendances

Club attendances

Updated to matches played on 3 September 2022 (Round 27)

Top 10 attendances

Updated to matches played on 3 September 2022 – Round 27

Rule changes
The Rugby Football League (RFL) approved three rules changes for 2022. On 20 January 2022, The RFL confirmed that scrums will return to all competitions, including the Championship and League 1, having been suspended as part of the game's COVID-19 response in 2020 and 2021. Scrums are only being reintroduced for errors (knock-on, forward pass or accidental offside) in the first four tackles of a set. Other cases, where previously a scrum would have been awarded, for example - ball into touch on the full, ball kicked or passed into touch, incorrect play the ball; will result in a handover.

The ball steal law will revert to the 2020 rule where the ball can only be stolen in a one-on-one tackle and not during a multi-person tackle where the additional tacklers have peeled off the tackle before the steal. Finally, injured players will be required to leave the pitch for treatment, if possible, following complaints that stoppages for injury spoil the speed and flow of the game.
On 28 January, the RFL introduced new laws for the 2022 season, including the "green card", whereas if play is stopped due to  a player needing attention, they must then either be substituted, leave the field for a concussion test, or wait on the sideline for 2 minutes before returning.

The green card is only shown to a player, if the team doctor enters the field of play, without being invited by the match official.

Broadcasting
In the first season of a new UK TV rights deal, Sky Sports remained the principal live broadcaster but for a reduced fee and now on a non-exclusive basis; Channel 4 picked up the rights to show eight regular-season and two play-off matches (not the Grand Final) in a deal confirmed in November 2021. This is the first live rights deal signed between Super League and a British free-to-air network.  BBC Sport retain highlights rights.

The match on Saturday 12 February 2022 between Leeds Rhinos and Warrington Wolves became the first Super League game to be shown live on British terrestrial television.

References

Super League XXVII